Madhuca palembanica is a tree in the family Sapotaceae. It is named for Palembang in Sumatra.

Description
The bark is greyish brown.

Distribution and habitat
Madhuca palembanica is native to Sumatra and Borneo. Its habitat is mixed dipterocarp forest from  altitude.

Conservation
Madhuca palembanica has been assessed as vulnerable on the IUCN Red List. The species is threatened by logging and conversion of land for palm oil plantations.

References

palembanica
Trees of Sumatra
Trees of Borneo
Plants described in 1861